Chelsea Embankment is part of the Thames Embankment, a road and walkway along the north bank of the River Thames in central London, England.

The western end of Chelsea Embankment, including a stretch of Cheyne Walk, is in the Royal Borough of Kensington and Chelsea; the eastern end, including Grosvenor Road and Millbank, is in the City of Westminster. Beneath the road lies the main low-level interceptor sewer taking waste water from west London eastwards towards Beckton.

Chelsea Bridge and Albert Bridge are to the south. Royal Hospital Chelsea is to the north. Sloane Square is the closest tube station, located to the north.

History 

The embankment was completed to a design by Joseph Bazalgette and was part of the Metropolitan Board of Works' grand scheme to provide London with a modern sewage system. It was opened on 9 May 1874 by Prince Alfred, Duke of Edinburgh.

Notable buildings

Garden Corner, 13 Chelsea Embankment - Grade II* listed 
Swan House, 17 Chelsea Embankment - Grade II* listed

Local streets 

 Chelsea Bridge Road
 Royal Hospital Road
 West Road
 Tite Street

References

External links 
 LondonTown.com information
 Chelsea Embankment Gardens information from the Royal Borough of Kensington and Chelsea

 

Streets in the Royal Borough of Kensington and Chelsea
Buildings and structures on the River Thames
Waterfronts
Chelsea, London